The Flemish Region, usually simply referred to as Flanders is one of the three regions of Belgium—alongside the Walloon Region and the Brussels-Capital Region. Covering the northern portion of the country, the Flemish Region is primarily Dutch-speaking.

The Flemish Region is distinct from the Flemish Community: the latter encompasses both the inhabitants of the Flemish Region and the Dutch-speaking minority living in the Brussels-Capital Region.

Politics
Immediately after its establishment in 1980, the region transferred all its constitutional competencies to the Flemish Community. Thus, the current Flemish authorities (Flemish Parliament and Flemish Government) represent all the Flemish people, including those living in the Brussels-Capital Region. Hence, the Flemish Region is governed by the Flemish Community institutions. However, members of the Flemish Community parliament elected in the Brussels-Capital Region have no right to vote on Flemish regional affairs.

Administrative divisions

The Flemish Region comprises five provinces, each consisting of administrative arrondissements that, in turn, contain municipalities (in total 300 municipalities in Flanders).

The seat of the Flemish parliament is located in Brussels, which is an enclave withinbut not part ofthe Flemish region, being specified that the Brussels-Capital Region is established as an administrative region of Belgium in its own right. In contrast, the Walloon parliament has established its parliament in the territory of Wallonia, specifically in the city of Namur, Namur Province.

Economy
Flanders is home to a diversified modern economy, with emphasis put on research and development. Many enterprises work closely with local knowledge and research centres to develop new products and services. The Gross domestic product (GDP) of the region was 270 billion € in 2018, accounting for 59% of Belgium's economic output. GDP per capita adjusted for purchasing power was 36,300 € or 136% of the EU27 average in the same year.

Transport

"De Lijn" serves as the main public transport company, run by the Flemish government. It consists of buses and trams. TEC is the equivalent company in Wallonia, and MIVB-STIB in Brussels. The railway network run by the NMBS, however, is a federal responsibility.

The Flemish government is also responsible for about 500 kilometers of regional roads (Dutch: gewestwegen) and about 900 kilometers of highways in the territory of the Flemish Region. Other types of roads are provincial roads and municipal roads.

Demographics

Cities
Largest cities in the region include (with population figures as of 1 January 2018):

Antwerp (523,248)
Ghent (260,341)
Bruges (118,284)
Leuven (101,396)
Mechelen (86,304)
Aalst (85,715)
Hasselt (77,651)
Sint-Niklaas (76,756)
Kortrijk (76,265)
Ostend (71,332)
Genk (66,110)
Roeselare (62,301)

The Flemish Diamond (Dutch: Vlaamse Ruit) is the name of the central, populous area in Flanders and consists of several of these cities, such as Antwerp, Ghent, Leuven and Mechelen. Approximately 5,500,000 people live in the area.

Language
The official language of the Flemish Region is Dutch. The dialect cluster spoken in the region is sometimes colloquially referred to as Flemish (Vlaams), Flemish Dutch (Vlaams-Nederlands), Belgian Dutch (Belgisch-Nederlands), or Southern Dutch (Zuid-Nederlands). Spelling and grammar are regulated by a single authority, the Dutch Language Union (Nederlandse Taalunie), comprising a committee of ministers of the Flemish and Dutch governments, their advisory council of appointed experts, a controlling commission of 22 parliamentarians, and a secretariat. The term Flemish can be applied to the Dutch spoken in Flanders; it shows many regional and local variations. The main dialect groups include West Flemish, East Flemish, Brabantian and Limburgish.

French (specifically Belgian French) may also be used in the Flemish Region for certain administrative purposes in a limited number of the so-called "municipalities with language facilities" around the Brussels-Capital Region and on the border with Wallonia. These "rim municipalities" around Brussels are Drogenbos, Kraainem, Linkebeek, Sint-Genesius-Rode, Wemmel and Wezembeek-Oppem. Brussels was originally a Dutch-speaking city (Brabantian dialect to be exact), but it was francised in the 19th and 20th centuries and is now officially bilingual in French and Dutch (although largely French-speaking in practice). Municipalities with language facilities on the border with Wallonia are Bever (French: Biévène), Herstappe, Mesen (French: Messines), Ronse (French: Renaix), Spiere-Helkijn (French: Espierres-Helchin), and Voeren (French: Fourons).

Religion

According to a 2016 survey by the Free University of Brussels, 68% of Flemish citizens are Roman Catholic, 2% are Protestant, 26% are irreligious, while 2% have other religions.

International relations

Twin regions and sister regions
  Aichi, Japan

See also
Communities, regions and language areas of Belgium
Count of Flanders
De Vlaamse Leeuw
Flanders
Flemish
Provinces of Belgium

References

Footnotes

Notes

External links

  Flemish authorities (Dutch: Vlaamse overheid).
  Flanders online (also in French, German and Dutch).
 Toerisme Vlaanderen
  French Flanders 
  Frans-Vlaanderen
  The Flemish region reaches 6 million inhabitants

Politics of Flanders
Regions of Belgium
Government of Belgium
NUTS 1 statistical regions of the European Union